Uyghur may refer to:

 Uyghurs, a Turkic ethnic group living in Eastern and Central Asia
 Uyghur language, a Turkic language spoken primarily by the Uyghurs
 Uyghur alphabets, any of four systems used to write the language
 Uyghur Khaganate, a Turkic empire in the mid 8th and 9th centuries
 Old Uyghur language, a different Turkic language spoken in the Uyghur Khaganate
 Uygur, Kulp, a village in Turkey

See also 
 Xinjiang Uyghur Autonomous Region
 Yugur, or Yellow Uyghur, another ethnic group of China
 Western Yugur language, the Turkic language spoken by the Yugur people and descending from Old Uyghur
 Eastern Yugur language, the Mongolic language spoken within the Yugur ethnic group
 Uygur (disambiguation)

Language and nationality disambiguation pages